Khaled Khaled is the twelfth studio album by American record producer DJ Khaled. It was released through We the Best Music and Epic Records on April 30, 2021. The album features guest appearances from Lil Wayne, Jeremih, Lil Baby, Lil Durk, Cardi B, H.E.R., Migos, Post Malone, Megan Thee Stallion, DaBaby, Justin Bieber, 21 Savage, Bryson Tiller, Roddy Ricch, Drake, A Boogie wit da Hoodie, Big Sean, Rick Ross, Puff Daddy, Nas, Jay-Z, James Fauntleroy, Justin Timberlake, Meek Mill, Buju Banton, Capleton, and Bounty Killer.

Background
The title of the album is named after Khaled's real name, Khaled Khaled. It was executive produced by himself, his respective first and second children and sons, Asahd and Aalam Tuck Khaled, with Allah also being credited as an executive producer due to the Khaled family's religious beliefs and spirituality in Islam. Khaled Khaled is the first album by Khaled to be released since the birth of Aalam, his second child, on January 20, 2020. Khaled also played songs from the album to American rapper Kanye West, who came to his house days before it was released. On April 29, 2021, in an interview with Chelsea Briggs of Billboard, Khaled said that he hopes that the album will help his fans "to be inspired, motivated, but I want them to be great" and "don't hold back your greatness, don't let nobody  stop the vision, but move with love", and stated that the latter takeaway is the most important part.

Release and promotion
On July 15, 2020, Khaled announced the title of the album alongside the titles and respective song artworks for its dual lead singles, "Popstar" and "Greece", both of which feature Canadian rapper Drake, which were released two days later. Khaled had originally planned to release it sometime in the third or fourth quarter of 2020, but did not for unknown reasons. He teased most of the collaborations on the album before since he announced it. On April 27, 2021, he shared the album artwork and announced its release date. The following day, he revealed its track listing, while also teasing the ninth track from the album, "Sorry Not Sorry", which features American rappers Nas and Jay-Z and American singer-songwriter James Fauntleroy. American singer Beyoncé appears as part of the Hive. He revealed an updated track listing that added the track "Big Paper", which features American rapper Cardi B, which was not on the previous track listing.

Singles
DJ Khaled released the dual lead singles of the album, "Popstar" and "Greece", both of which feature Canadian rapper and singer Drake, on July 17, 2020. The second single, "Let It Go", which features Canadian singer Justin Bieber and Atlanta-based rapper 21 Savage, was released on May 10, 2021. The third single, "Every Chance I Get", which features American rappers Lil Baby and Lil Durk, was sent to US rhythmic contemporary radio one day later, May 11, 2021. The fourth single, "I Did It", which features American rapper and singer Post Malone and American rappers Megan Thee Stallion, Lil Baby, and DaBaby, was sent to UK rhythmic contemporary radio on May 21, 2021 and US contemporary hit radio on June 1, 2021. The fifth single, "Body in Motion", which features American singer Bryson Tiller and American rappers Lil Baby and Roddy Ricch, was sent to rhythmic contemporary radio on September 14, 2021.

Critical reception

Khaled Khaled was met with mixed reviews from music critics. At Metacritic, which assigns a normalized rating out of 100 to reviews from professional publications, the album received an average score of 58 based on eight reviews, indicating "mixed or average reviews".

A few days before the album's release, Chris Deville of Stereogum opined that the "extravagant list of guest stars" on it "feels especially indulgent" and "it's not just that Khaled Khaled seems predestined to be an event album nearly every track seems like it could be a breakout hit based on the lineup of performers alone". In a lukewarm three-star review, NME's Luke Morgan Britton wrote: "This is a slightly hollow, glitzy blockbuster of an album, and we could well be reaching Brand Khaled fatigue very soon. But for now, and after endless hits and three Platinum albums, you can forgive him for refusing to change the blueprint." Of the album's lengthy guest list, Britton said: "If you swapped numbers with Khaled at an after-party and aren't on this album, you should feel offended."

Commercial performance
Khaled Khaled debuted at number one on the US Billboard 200 chart, earning 93,000 album-equivalent units (including 14,000 copies in pure album sales) in its first week. This became DJ Khaled's third US number one album on the chart. The album also accumulated a total of 106.87 million on-demand streams of the album’s songs. On February 23, 2022, the album was certified platinum by the Recording Industry Association of America (RIAA) for combined sales and album-equivalent units of over 1,000,000 units in the United States.

Track listing

Notes
  signifies a co-producer
 All tracks are stylized in all caps.
 "Sorry Not Sorry" contains additional vocals from Beyoncé, who is credited as "Harmonies by the Hive".
 "I Can Have It All" also appears on H.E.R.'s debut studio album, Back of My Mind (2021), with DJ Khaled and Bryson Tiller being credited as featured artists; however, Meek Mill is not credited, but his verse is still present on that version.

Personnel
Technical

 Chris Athens – mastering
 Mike Dean – mastering, mixing (track 5)
 Manny Marroquin – mixing (1–7, 9–14)
 Chris Galland – mixing (1, 5), engineering assistance (2–4, 6, 7, 9–12, 14)
 Jeremie Inhaber – mixing (6, 7, 14), engineering assistance (1–5, 9–12)
 Derek Ali – mixing (7)
 Raymond "Cino" Argueta – mixing (7), engineering (10)
 40 – mixing (8, 13)
 AyoJuan – engineering (1–7, 9–12, 14), vocal engineering (8, 13)
 Ed1dmc – engineering (1)
 Manny Galvez – engineering (1)
 Darth "Denver" Moon – engineering (2)
 Mattazik Muzik – engineering (2, 5, 7)
 Evan LaRay – engineering (3)
 Smitty Beatz – engineering (4)
 DJ Durel – engineering (4)
 Luis Bordeaux – engineering (4, 12)
 Nick Mac – engineering (5)
 Heidi Wang – engineering (6)
 Elijah Marrett-Hitch – engineering (6)
 Josh Gudwin – engineering (6)
 Bryson Tiller – engineering (7)
 Chris Dennis – engineering (7)
 Noel Cadastre – engineering (8, 13)
 Alex Estevez – engineering (9)
 Roark Bailey – engineering (9)
 Thomas Tomcat Bennett – engineering (9)
 Tom Kahre – engineering (9)
 David Kim – engineering (10)
 Gabriel Zardes – engineering (10)
 Young Guru – engineering (10)
 Chris Godbey – engineering (11)
 Anthony Cruz – engineering (12)
 Jermaine J August Reid – engineering (14)
 Orette Howell – engineering (14)
 Taj-Vaughn Johnson – engineering (14)
 Dave Huffman – engineering assistance
 Anthony Vilchis – engineering assistance (1–7, 9–12, 14)
 Zach Pereyra – engineering assistance (1–7, 9–12, 14)
 Joseph Villiard – engineering assistance (4)
 Paul Joasil – engineering assistance (4)
 Richard Evatt – engineering assistance (11)

Artwork and performance
 Christopher Feldmann – art direction, design
 Jonathan Mannion – photography
 Erick Coomes – bass guitar (4)
 Maxime Breton – background vocals, programming (11, 12)

Charts

Weekly charts

Year-end charts

Certifications

References

2021 albums
DJ Khaled albums
Albums produced by DJ Khaled
Albums produced by 9th Wonder
Albums produced by Cool & Dre
Albums produced by Tay Keith